Akara Amarttayakul (born April 19, 1974) is a Thai actor, model and singer. His films include Necromancer and Muay Thai Chaiya. His nickname is "Gof".

Biography
Akara was schooled in the United States from age 11. He graduated from the Fashion Institute of Technology. While back in Thailand during a holiday, he was cast by director Euthana Mukdasanit in Vithi Khonkla in 1991.

He was cast in a Thai television drama based on life of Mitr Chaibancha, He co-starred with Tata Young in the TV drama Plai Tien.

He made his debut feature film leading role in Mae bia (Snake lady), opposite Napakpapha Nakprasitte. Next was Saving Private Tootsie, portraying the young captain of a Royal Thai Army unit assigned to rescue some transvestite entertainers from a plane crash on the Myanmar border.

In Jom kha mung wej, he portrayed a policeman who sets out to hunt down a criminal (Chatchai Plengpanich) skilled in black magic. The film won several awards in Thailand.

Also in 2005, he was cast in The King Maker, an Anglo-Thai historical epic adapted from The Legend of Suriyothai story. Akara portrayed Pan Bud Sri Thep, the lover of Lady Si Sudachan.

After undergoing extensive training, he starred in Muay Thai Chaiya, portraying a fierce Muay Thai fighter in the 2007 drama film.

Filmography
 Mae bia, or Snake Lady (2001)
 Saving Private Tootsie (2002)
 The King Maker (2005)
 Jom kha mung wej or Necromancer (2005)
 Loveaholic (2006)
 Muay Thai Chaiya (2007)
 The Intruder (2010)

External links
 

1974 births
Living people
Akara Amarttayakul
Akara Amarttayakul
Akara Amarttayakul
Akara Amarttayakul